Yellow Green Line may refer to:

 Yellow Green Line (Denver)
 Yellow Green Line (Paris)

See also 
 Green Line (disambiguation)
 Yellow Line (disambiguation)